Hannah Kasulka is an American actress known for her role as Casey Rance in the 2016 Fox  television series The Exorcist,  and as Meegan Bishop in  Filthy Preppy Teen$.

Early life
Kasulka was born and raised in the town of Macon, Georgia, as an only child to her mother, a hairdresser and her grandmother a pastor. She attended the Georgia Institute of Technology in Atlanta, and obtained BS degree in Management in 2009. During her years as a student in university, Kasulka had taken acting lessons, after graduation she moved to Los Angeles, California to pursue an acting career. She started work in a coffee shop, meeting people who persuaded her to join The Upright Citizens Brigade Theatre enrolling in acting and scene study classes, which turned out to be a good platform to launch her acting career.

Career 
Kasulka had never even seen the 1973 film  The Exorcist before she landed a lead role in the 2016 Fox television series The Exorcist, as Casey Rance, an 18 year-old girl who has been possessed by an evil force.

In 2019, Kasulka acted in, wrote and directed the short film  Bird of Shame,  shot entirely in black and white with zero dialogue. Kasulka also played the leading role in the horror film Witches In The Woods  first screened at the 2019 Arrow Video Frightfest.

In 2021, Kasulka stars in the film Playing God where she plays Rachel in a brother and sister con-artist duo who attempt to swindle a grief-stricken billionaire by deception, introducing him to whom he thinks is God.

Personal life

Kasulka is a supporter of the  Sheldrick Wildlife Trust which operates an orphan elephant rescue and rehabilitation program in Kenya.

Filmography

Film

Television

Awards and nominations

References

External links 
 
Interview with Exorcist co-star Brianne Howey

Living people
21st-century American actresses
American television actresses
American film actresses
Actresses from Georgia (U.S. state)
Actors from Macon, Georgia
People from Macon, Georgia
Georgia Tech alumni
Upright Citizens Brigade Theater performers
Year of birth missing (living people)